

Afghanistan

Åland

Albania

Alderney

Algeria

American Samoa

Andorra

Angola

Anguilla

Antarctica

Antigua and Barbuda

Argentina

Armenia

Aruba

Australia

Austria

Azerbaijan

Lists of country codes